The Federation of Metal was a trade union representing metalworkers in Spain.

The union was founded in December 1976 and affiliated to the Workers' Commissions.  The federation's largest affiliate, it had 103,161 members by 1981, and 113,871 in 1993.  Later that year, it merged with the National Federation of Mining, to form the Federation of Metalworkers and Miners.

General Secretaries
1977: Adolfo Pinedo
1981: Juan Ignacio Marín
1987: Ignacio Fernández Toxo

References

Metal trade unions
Trade unions established in 1976
Trade unions disestablished in 1993
Trade unions in Spain